Amanieu d'Albret (1478 – 1520) (called the Cardinal d'Albret) was a French Roman Catholic cardinal.

Biography

Amanieu d'Albret was born in the Kingdom of France ca. 1478, the son of Alain I of Albret, and Frances, Countess of Périgord.  His older brother Jean married Catherine of Navarre.  His uncle Louis d'Albret was also a cardinal.  He had three illegitimate children, one son and two daughters.

Early in his career, he became a protonotary apostolic.  He was also Archimandrite of San Rufo.

On 19 July 1499 he became apostolic administrator of the see of Comminges but on 1 January 1502 the cathedral chapter of Saint-Bertrand-de-Comminges Cathedral chose another candidate as bishop.

Pope Alexander VI made him a cardinal deacon in the consistory of 20 March 1500.  The pope sent him the red hat on 2 October 1500 and he received the deaconry of San Nicola in Carcere on 5 October 1500.

From 4 May to 10 October 1500 he was administrator of the see of Oloron.  He was administrator of the see of Pamiers from 14 March 1502 until 1506.

After Cardinal Giuliano della Rovere sought refuge in Savona, Cardinal d'Albret was secretly despatched on 21 June 1502 to bring him back, but failed in this mission.

He participated in both the papal conclave of September 1503 that elected Pope Pius III. and the papal conclave of October 1503 that elected Pope Julius II.  After this second conclave he had to leave Rome.

He was administrator of the see of Vannes from 8 January to 14 October 1504; of the see of Bazas from 4 December 1504 until his death; of the see of Lescar from 6 October 1507 until 20 June 1515; and of the see of Pamplona from 13 May 1510 until 1512, and again from 1517 until his death.

He participated in the plot of cardinals against Pope Julius II.  In 1511, he attended the schismatic Council of Pisa even after the pope threatened him with excommunication.  There, he was a strong supporter of the French party.

After the death of Julius II, he participated in the papal conclave of 1513 that elected Pope Leo X.  The new pope absolved Cardinal d'Albret (along with Cardinals Guillaume Briçonnet and René de Prie) and confirmed him in his offices.  He also served as administrator of the see of Pamiers from 1514 until his death.  He became the cardinal protodeacon on 3 September 1520.

He died in Casteljaloux on 20 December 1520.  He is buried in Casteljaloux.

References

House of Albret
1478 births
1520 deaths
16th-century French cardinals
Cardinals created by Pope Alexander VI
Bishops of Bazas